Eucalantica ehecatlella is a moth in the family Yponomeutidae. It is found in Costa Rica (Central Volcanic Range in Heredia Province).

The length of the forewings is 5-6.2 mm.

Etymology
The specific epithet is derived from Ehecatl, a god of wind in Aztec mythology and refers to the windy habitat where the new species was collected.

References

Moths described in 2011
Yponomeutidae